The 1941 Titleholders Championship was contested from April 7–9 at Augusta Country Club. It was the 5th edition of the Titleholders Championship.

This event was won by Dorothy Kirby, with rounds of 80-72-72.

Final leaderboard

External links
The Tuscaloosa News source
The Pittsburgh Press source

Titleholders Championship
Golf in Georgia (U.S. state)
Titleholders Championship
Titleholders Championship
Titleholders Championship
Titleholders Championship
Women's sports in Georgia (U.S. state)